Harpeth Island is an island in the Cumberland River in Cheatham County, Tennessee, US. It is the largest river island between the Old Hickory Dam and the Cheatham Dam. It is located near Ashland City, Tennessee. It spans 20 acres within the Cheatham Lake Wildlife Management Area, and it is owned by the United States Army Corps of Engineers. The island was surveyed by the Army Corps in 1930. It is a walk-in area for fishing on Mondays, Tuesdays and Fridays.

References

River islands of Tennessee
Geography of Cheatham County, Tennessee
Cumberland River
United States Army Corps of Engineers